Pir Gheyb (also Romanized as Pīr Gheyb) is a village in Seyyed Shahab Rural District, in the Central District of Tuyserkan County, Hamadan Province, Iran. At the 2006 census, its population was 252, in 69 families.

References 

Populated places in Tuyserkan County